Hrvatski košarkaški klub Široki, commonly referred to as HKK Široki or simply Široki, is a men's professional basketball club based in Široki Brijeg, Bosnia and Herzegovina. The team currently competes in the Basketball Championship of Bosnia and Herzegovina. With eleven Bosnia and Herzegovina Championship and nine Cups of Bosnia and Herzegovina won Široki is the most successful basketball team in the country.

History

Founded in 1974, the club became the basketball center in the south-west of SR Bosnia and Herzegovina but never played in the Yugoslavian elite league in the past.

First being registered under the name KK Mladost the club participated in lower leagues for years but had to stop its activities for two years in 1992 due to War in Bosnia. Afterwards the club was renamed HKK Široki and got a place in the newly established Bosnian national league and in 1998 took the double crown, in the national championship and in the national cup. Moving to the Pecara Sports Hall, with a capacity of 4,500 seats, the richest period in the club's history was still to come. Široki Hercegtisak received the invitation to the ABA League in the first years of its existence and was unbeatable in both domestic championships between 2002 and 2004. It was the club's decision to also participate in the FIBA European competitions for years, but as it is located in the Croatian part of the country the club became more orientated toward the neighboring country of Croatia after the war in the 90's.

Home arena 

Široki plays their home games at the Pecara Sports Hall. It has a seating capacity of 4,500.

Sponsorship naming
The club has had several denominations through the years due to its sponsorship:
 Feal Široki (2001–2003)
 Široki Hercegtisak (2003–2004)
 Široki HT Eronet (2005–2008)
 Široki Prima pivo (2008–2009)
 Široki TT Kabeli (2009–2011)
 Široki WWin (2011–2012)
 Široki Primorka (2013–2014)

Players

Current roster

Trophies and awards
Source

Notable players

 Stipe Šarlija
 Darko Planinić
 Stanko Barać
 Fran Pilepić
 Željko Šakić
 Ivan Ramljak
 Gordan Zadravec
 Domagoj Bošnjak
 Josip Vranković
 Josip Sesar
 Ivan Buva
 Boris Barać
 Mladen Erjavec
 Davor Pejčinović
 Mateo Drežnjak
 Ivan Novačić
 Ivan Grgat
 Šime Špralja
 Martin Vanjak
 Josip Bilinovac
 Dalibor Peršić
 Marko Šutalo
 Richard Dumas

 Chester Mason
 Johnathon Jones

See also 
 KK Mladost

References

External links

 
 HKK Siroki at Eurobasket.com

Siroki
Siroki
Siroki
Croatian sports clubs outside Croatia
Široki Brijeg